Bevara Sverige Svenskt (BSS; "Keep Sweden Swedish") was a far-right, racist organisation based in Stockholm, Sweden and the precursor of the current Sweden Democrats political party; it also remains a slogan used by various Swedish nationalist parties. The stated objective of the BSS movement, and the aim of the slogan, was to initiate a debate in order to stop immigration by non-Europeans and repatriate non-ethnic Swedes. Inspiration came from the post-World War II fascist organisation Nysvenska Rörelsen created by Per Engdahl. The group was often violent.

Founded as a loosely organised network in 1979 by Leif Zeilon, and formalised as an organisation in 1983, BSS was involved with the populist Progress Party in 1986. This co-operation took place under the name Sweden Party. This cooperation evolved into the Sweden Democrats (SD) in 1988.

Claiming not to be racists, their often aggressive sticker campaigns arguably indicated otherwise with slogans such as "Låt inte din dotter bli en negerleksak" (Don't let your daughter become a negro toy) and "Negrer hotar sina offer" (Negros threaten their victims).

Although the number of members was comparatively small, BSS represented the first organised attempt to reduce immigration and as a result received massive media attention.

The slogan "Keep Sweden Swedish" was taken on by the Sweden Democrats and became prevalent during 2003–2004, when it was used for headlines in the party newspaper "SD Kuriren" and as a slogan on bumper stickers and T-shirts.

Notes

References
Charles Westin: Neo-Nazism in a Welfare State: The Example of Sweden. In Journal of Conflict and Violence Research, Volume 2, 2000

1979 establishments in Sweden
1986 disestablishments in Sweden
Anti-black racism in Europe
Anti-immigration politics in Europe
Far-right politics in Sweden
Political movements in Sweden
Swedish nationalism
Racism in Sweden
Political catchphrases
Organizations established in 1979
Organizations disestablished in 1986